Abdullah Siddiqui is a Pakistani singer, songwriter, and producer. He made his breakthrough appearance on Nescafé Basement season 5 with his song "Resistance", and followed it up by making his album debut with Metannoya in 2019. He further released Heterotopia (2020), dead Beat poets (2021) and dead Beats poets: side B (2021).

In January 2022, he was announced as an associate producer of Coke Studio season 14. The same month, he produced the 2022 Pakistan Super League anthem "Agay Dekh".

Life and career

2000–2017: Early life and career beginnings 
Siddiqui was born and grew up in Lahore. He began producing English-language electronic music at the age of 11, and started releasing it on his Youtube account as an independent artist when he was 16. He worked with independent platforms Forever South and True Brew Records. On the former, he released "Fiction" in December 2017 and "Warm & Unredeemed" with in January 2018.

2018–2020: Nescafé Basement and nominations 
He released his original song "Resistance" in 2018, for which he picked up a nomination in the Best Emerging Talent (Music) category at the 17th Lux Style Awards.

He sang Peshawar Zalmi's anthem for 2021 Pakistan Super League titled "Kingdom" along with Altamash Sever. In 2021, he was included in the Forbes list of 30 Under 30 - Asia - Entertainment & Sports. On 25 December 2020, Siddiqui released "Be Myself" with singer Aima Baig. The track also featured on Heterotopia.

2022–present: Coke Studio and Pakistan Super League 
On 5 January 2022, Siddiqui announced via his Instagram account that he would be an associate producer on season 14 of Coke Studio. On 13 January 2022, it was announced that he would be writing and producing the 2022 Pakistan Super League anthem featuring vocals by Atif Aslam and Aima Baig. The anthem, named "Agay Dekh" was released on 24 January 2022 to a mixed reception.

Siddiqui was also involved with the film score of the 2022 Pakistani film, Joyland, which had its world premiere at the 75th Cannes Film Festival. He is planning to release another album in 2022.

References 

21st-century Pakistani musicians
Musicians from Lahore
Year of birth missing (living people)
Living people